Darrio Melton is an American politician who served as the Mayor of Selma from 2016 to 2020 and served in the Alabama House of Representatives from the 67th district from 2010 to 2016.

References

1979 births
Living people
Politicians from Selma, Alabama
Mayors of places in Alabama
Democratic Party members of the Alabama House of Representatives
African-American mayors in Alabama